Alastair Francis Buchan,  (9 September 1918 – 4 February 1976) was a leading writer on defence studies in the 1970s.

Career
The son of John Buchan, 1st Baron Tweedsmuir, Alastair Buchan was given the same forename as his father's brother, who had been killed in the First World War. He was educated at Eton College and at Christ Church, Oxford, Buchan joined the Canadian Army and saw active service in the Second World War.

Having worked as a journalist with The Observer, Buchan was appointed Director of the International Institute for Strategic Studies in 1958, Commandant of the Imperial Defence College in 1969, and Montague Burton Professor of International Relations at the University of Oxford in 1972. In 1973 he gave the Reith Lectures on the theme "Change Without War".

Family
In 1942 Buchan married Hope Gilmore; they had two sons and a daughter.

References

External links
 1973 Reith Lecture Alastair Buchan, Change Without War
Obituary: Alastair Francis Buchan, 1918–1976 in The Round Table by Michael Howard

1918 births
1976 deaths
People educated at Eton College
Alumni of Christ Church, Oxford
Canadian Army officers
Commanders of the Order of the British Empire
Fellows of Balliol College, Oxford
The Observer people
Canadian Army personnel of World War II
Younger sons of barons
Montague Burton Professors of International Relations (University of Oxford)